Claudia Maria Constantinescu (born 18 June 1994) is a Romanian handballer who plays for Rapid București.

Achievements 
Cupa României: 
Winner: 2019

Liga Națională: 
Golden Medalist: 2022
Silver Medalist: 2019
Bronze Medalist: 2017

References
 

1994 births
Living people
People from Balș
Romanian female handball players